Ángelo Martino (born 5 June 1998) is an Argentine professional footballer who plays as a left-back for Talleres.

Career
Martino started his career with Atlético de Rafaela, appearing for the first time on 13 March 2017 in a Primera División match against Aldosivi. He scored his first senior goal on 15 April versus Independiente, with Rafaela later ending the campaign with relegation to Primera B Nacional. He featured thirty-seven times across the next four campaigns in all competitions at that level, whilst also scoring two further goals; against Brown and Defensores de Belgrano (cup). On 25 February 2021, Martino headed back to the Primera División after agreeing a four-year contract with Talleres; having paid to terminate his Rafaela contract five months early.

Martino made his Talleres debut on 27 February in a 2–2 draw in the Copa de la Liga Profesional against Newell's Old Boys, after the left-back replaced Augusto Schott off the bench with ten minutes remaining.

Career statistics
.

References

External links
 

1998 births
Living people
People from Rafaela
Argentine people of Italian descent
Argentine footballers
Association football defenders
Argentine Primera División players
Primera Nacional players
Atlético de Rafaela footballers
Talleres de Córdoba footballers
Sportspeople from Santa Fe Province